Dangar may refer to: gurkirpal multani
 Armorhide: a character of Transformers
 Dangar - Ufo Robo: an arcade game of Nichibutsu inspired by the above
 Dangar Falls: a waterfall near Dorrigo, New South Wales
 Dangars Falls: a waterfall near Dangarsleigh, New South Wales
 Dangar Island: an island of Australia
 Dangar's Lagoon: a waterhole beside Thunderbolts Way, near Uralla, New South Wales
 Mount Dangar: a mountain in the Goulburn River National Park, near Denman, New South Wales
 A food preparation from the state of Maharashtra in Western India

People with the surname
 Henry Dangar (1796–1861), surveyor and explorer of Australia
Shraddha Dangar (born 1994), Indian actress and model